Kopuzlu is a village in the Keban District of Elazığ Province in Turkey. Its population is 59 (2021). The village is populated by Alevi Turkmens.

References

Villages in Keban District